The 2015 Jayco Herald Sun Tour was the 62nd edition of the Herald Sun Tour road cycling stage race. The race was rated as 2.1 and was part of the 2015 UCI Oceania Tour. The 2015 race consisted of five stages in Victoria, starting in Melbourne on 4 February and finished at the summit finish on Arthurs Seat on 8 February.

The race was won by Australian Cameron Meyer of the  cycling team. Meyer succeeded his teammate Simon Clarke, who won the 2014 edition of the race and finished fourth in the 2015 race. Meyer had taken over the overall lead following a victory in the first road stage of the race and was able to defend his lead through the remaining stages. The other riders to finish on the overall podium were Patrick Bevin and Joseph Cooper (both ).

Meyer also won the points classification, while Cameron Bayly won the mountains classification and Robert Power (Jayco–AIS Australia U23) won the young rider classification.  won the teams classification.

Teams 
16 teams entered the 2015 Herald Sun Tour, of which one was a UCI World Tour team and three were national teams.

 
 
 
 
 
 
 
 Team Budget Forklifts
 
 
 Navitas Satalyst
 
 
 Australia
 Great Britain
 Jayco–AIS Australia U23

Route

Stages

Prologue 
4 February 2015 — Melbourne, individual time trial (ITT)

Stage 1 
5 February 2015 — Mount Macedon to Bendigo,

Stage 2 
6 February 2015 — Bendigo to Nagambie,

Stage 3 
7 February 2015 — Mitchellstown to Nagambie,

Stage 4 
8 February 2015 — Arthurs Seat to Arthurs Seat,

Classification leadership table
In the 2015 Herald Sun Tour, four different jerseys were awarded. For the general classification, calculated by adding each cyclist's finishing times on each stage, and allowing time bonuses for the first three finishers at intermediate sprints and at the finish of mass-start stages, the leader received a yellow jersey. This classification was considered the most important of the 2015 Herald Sun Tour, and the winner of the classification was considered the winner of the race.

Additionally, there was a points classification, which awarded a green jersey. In the points classification, cyclists received points for finishing in the top 4 in a mass-start stage. For winning a stage, a rider earned 10 points, with 8 for second, 6 for third and 4 for fourth. Points towards the classification could also be accrued at intermediate sprint points during each stage; these intermediate sprints also offered bonus seconds towards the general classification. There was also a mountains classification, the leadership of which was marked by a yellow-and-black jersey. In the mountains classification, points were won by reaching the top of a climb before other cyclists, with more points available for the higher-categorised climbs.

The fourth jersey represented the young rider classification, marked by a white-and-blue jersey. This was decided in the same way as the general classification, but only riders born after 1 January 1992 were eligible to be ranked in the classification. There was also a classification for teams, in which the times of the best three cyclists per team on each stage were added together; the leading team at the end of the race was the team with the lowest total time, and its team members were given a white jersey on the final podium.

References 

Herald Sun Tour
Herald Sun Tour
Herald Sun Tour